Austar was an Australian telecommunications company which was founded in 1995 under the name Community Entertainment Television (CETV). Its main business activity was subscription television. It was also involved with internet access and mobile phones.

Austar's television subscriber base grew to 747,148 (on 30th June 2010), making it the largest subscription television operator in urban and rural Australia. Austar provided subscription television services to 2.4 million homes, a third of all homes in Australia  primarily using digital satellite technology. Austar also operated a digital cable network in Darwin.

Austar is now owned by Foxtel, which acquired the company in 2012. Since the acquisition, Foxtel has progressively merged all operations into the national system. Starting mid to late 2013, Foxtel merged all accounts to Foxtel and removed the MyStar related online services. This was the last step in the merge. In November 2013, the Foxtel IQ units were made available with satellite connections for those who wished to replace their MyStar units. The transition was completed in 2014, when all Austar branding was replaced with the current Foxtel moniker. Austar was involved with providing services to Sega Channel in Australia in partnership with Namco Bandai Partners, a joint venture between Sega, Ozisoft, and Foxtel.

Foxtel takeover
On 11 July 2011, Austar announced that "it had entered into definitive transaction agreements with Liberty Global, Inc. (LGI) and Foxtel Management Pty Limited (Foxtel) under which Foxtel will acquire AUSTAR by a series of transactions including a scheme of arrangement (Scheme)." This takeover involved a minority shareholder approval on 30 March 2012, the approval of the Australian Competition & Consumer Commission on 10 April 2012, and had approval from a Second Court Hearing. The Austar shares were suspended on the Australian Securities Exchange (ASX) as of 16 April 2012, and were delisted from the ASX on 27 April 2012. The takeover was completed on 24 May 2012.

Subscription television (Austar Television/Austar Digital)

Austar's main business was subscription television, serving customers outside of the major metro areas. It took programming from both Foxtel and Optus services, and operates on a digital platform.

Austar Television was available in 2.4 million homes in regional areas of New South Wales, Victoria, Queensland and South Australia and all areas of Tasmania and the Northern Territory. Subscriber numbers to Austar Television were second behind Foxtel. Delivery methods include utilising the Optus C-Class Satellite Optus C1 and a digital cable network in Darwin.

On Demand (Featured) 

Austar Featured on Demand used to deliver Austar shows–on demand–to the MyStar each week free of charge with a MyStar subscription. It has since been replaced by Foxtel On Demand.

Austar AnyWhere

Austar AnyWhere was Austar's online TV service, which allowed customers to watch or download full-length programs online. Austar Anywhere closed on 30 June 2013.

The MyStar personal digital recorder
MyStar was launched to existing subscribers in late 2007, with a general launch to both new and existing customers in February 2008.

The last MyStar was the model T500. It was a four-tuner set-top box equipped with two satellite tuners and two terrestrial tuners available both for viewing and recording standard definition digital free-to-air services including full electronic program guide data for Seven Network, WIN Television, Prime Television and Network Ten. (ABC, SBS and ABC2 continue to be provided via satellite). However, only two tuners can be used because the processor is not capable of handling all four tuners at once.

It featured a 160 GB hard drive, with 120 GB user accessible. It could record 60 hours of content. Because it is equipped with Macrovision copy protection, content saved to the MyStar cannot be transferred to other media (such as VHS or DVD) without the use of something such as a video stabiliser. It had support for Time shifting for up to one hour.

Support for Dolby Digital Surround Sound was available on selected programming when connected to appropriate equipment, however the Mystar box wouldn't control the volume when using optical or coax, the volume had to be controlled by the device it was plugged into. It also had support for Closed Captioning and four different aspect ratios (4:3 Cropped, 16:9 Letterbox, 16:9 Postcard and 16:9 Widescreen). Both of these features were accessible through the remote's coloured buttons.

It supported additional outputs not found in some of the standard decoders, such as Component Video, as well as both coaxial and optical digital audio outputs. Support for Composite Video, S-Video and RF out were also available. It also had USB and Ethernet ports, but they didn't have a clear function as yet, and were likely to be used for updating the decoder.

The MyStar Remote is similar to the standard Austar Digital remote, but it had the addition of buttons specific to recording and playing back video. It shared an almost identical design to the Foxtel iQ remote, with the exception that it has an Austar button instead of a Foxtel button, and there was no AV button.

The next generation of MyStar, called MyStar HD, was launched on 15 November 2009, with installations beginning the following day. It had many advantages over its predecessor, most notably support for 1080i, HD programming. It included a 320 GB hard disk, a doubling over the 160 GB found in the original MyStar. Only 160 GB of this was available for recordings and other user-selected content, with the other 160 GB being reserved for OnDemand content, which was launched in early 2010. MyStar HD also included an HDMI output, allowing HD content to be viewed in its native resolution. It had a model number of T600 and also a T601.

Austar planned to use MyStar HD as its cornerstone set-top box, with true video-on-demand launched in 2010, and more access to web content becoming available after that time, building up to a complete interface redesign for its set-top boxes in late 2011 or early 2012. Since the Foxtel acquisition, these plans have changed. The plan was originally to upgrade MyStar and phase it out in 2014, however, in 2013, Foxtel decided to convert their IQHD units to satellite connections and made them available to "Austar" customers in November 2013. Foxtel had no plans to force current MyStar subscribers to replace their unit. If they don't wish, however, they are offering upgrades to customers who wish to take advantage before the IQ3 launch in 2015.

Mystar criticism
MyStar had ongoing technical issues which have plagued the system since release; however, Austar have said that "they have a huge team of people that will actively jump onto any issues as soon as they are reported to the call centre". Some of the numerous bugs were The MyStar box regularly caused the screen to black out, recordings to fail, and the screen to freeze; it had also has been known to automatically switch itself off and on.

Austar Mobile (mobile telephony)
Established in 2000, Austar Mobile offered mobile services via resale agreements with Optus [GSM] mobile network. After the closure of Telstra's CDMA network, Austar mobile would only offer services through Optus. Austarmobile, on 31 December 2009, had 19,970 customers.

On 23 February 2011, M2 bought the contracts and records for its mobile service from Austar for $2 million.

Dial-up internet (Austarnet)
Established in 2000, Austarnet outsourced its network to COMindico and was available across Australia.

As of 31 December 2009, Austarnet had 12,671 customers.

In August 2011, Austarnet announced its exit from the Internet business and indicated that services would be discontinued on 30 September 2011.

Broadband internet (Austar Broadband)
Established in 2006, Austar Broadband operated as a trial network in Wagga Wagga and  Tamworth, New South Wales.

Austar held the 2.5 & 3.5 GHz spectrum licences in regional Australia. This spectrum is ideally suited for WiMAX.

Austar/Unwired Alliance
In 2005, Austar United and wireless internet provider Unwired announced a deal to swap spectrum under either company's control to allow for interoperable wireless broadband services across the country.   In 2006, Austar United and Unwired together with Soul Converged Telecommunications formed AUSalliance for the purposes of obtaining funding from the Australian Government's Broadband Connect Infrastructure Program and rolling out a regional broadband network.

Austar/Opel agreement
In 2008, Austar entered into an agreement to sell its 2.5 & 3.5 GHz spectrum licences to the OPEL consortium (Optus & Elders) for A$65 million and enter into a wholesale agreement with Optus for the resale of products operated by the OPEL consortium. The sale was contingent on the OPEL network rollout, so was cancelled upon the cancellation of the OPEL network by the Australian Government.

See also

Subscription television in Australia

Notes
1.

References

External links
Austar webpage 
Austar Broadband
Austar United webpage
MyStar webpage
Austarnet Closure

Australian companies established in 1995
Australian companies disestablished in 2012
Direct broadcast satellite services
Australian subscription television services
Defunct telecommunications companies of Australia
Companies based in Sydney
Telecommunications companies established in 1995
Telecommunications companies disestablished in 2012
Companies formerly listed on the Australian Securities Exchange
2012 mergers and acquisitions